Tytthaena ("little hyena") is an extinct genus of placental mammals from extinct subfamily Tytthaeninae within extinct family Oxyaenidae, that lived in North America from the late Paleocene to early Eocene.

Description
Tytthaena is the smallest oxyaenid known. Morphologically, it resembles Oxyaena. It can be distinguished from other oxyaenids by its size and dentition. Its molars were narrow, with elongate talonids.

Phylogeny
The phylogenetic relationships of genus Tytthaena are shown in the following cladogram.

See also
 Mammal classification
 Oxyaenidae

References

Oxyaenidae
Extinct mammals of North America
Paleocene first appearances
Eocene genus extinctions
Fossil taxa described in 1980
Taxa named by Philip D. Gingerich
Prehistoric placental genera